Eduardo Prado (born Eduardo Paulo da Silva Prado) was a Brazilian writer. He was born on February 27, 1860, in São Paulo, SP. He was the son of Martinho da Silva Prado and Veridiana da Silva Prado. He died in the same city on August 30, 1901.

Prado graduated from the Faculty of Law of São Paulo. At the time he was a regular contributor to the Correio Paulistano, writing on literary criticism and international politics. For some time he worked as an attaché at the Brazilian delegation in London. He visited several European countries and also Egypt. From these trips he would make observations in the book Viagens, published in Paris in 1886. A convinced monarchist, he was a friend of the Baron of Rio Branco, collaborating in the edition of Le Brésil in 1889, a work published on the occasion of the International Exhibition in Paris, commemorating the centenary of the French Revolution. He became friends with Portuguese writers Eça de Queirós, Ramalho Ortigão and Oliveira Martins, who belonged to the famous group of Vencidos da Vida. With the proclamation of the Republic in Brazil on November 15, 1889, he began to combat, in books and newspapers, the acts practiced by the republican government. Eça de Queirós, director of Revista de Portugal, published a series of articles by Prado under the pseudonym of Frederico de S., which would be gathered in a book entitled Fastos da Ditadura Militar no Brasil. He also contributed to A Década Republicana, a work in which the most prominent Brazilian monarchists collaborated.

Eduardo Prado was one of the founders of the Academia Brasileira de Letras, in which he occupied chair number 40, whose patron was the Viscount of Rio Branco. He also belonged to the Brazilian Historical and Geographic Institute. He fought the interference of the United States in Latin America, launching a controversial book, The American Illusion, the first edition of which, printed in 1895, was apprehended by the Brazilian Government. Severe criticism of the changes made by Republicans to the country's flag formed part of the book National Flag. He dedicated himself to historical studies, having published studies on Anchieta. Ronald de Carvalho, in his Little History of Brazilian Literature, had high praise for Eduardo Prado.

He lived in Paris, first on Rue Casimir Perrier and then on Rue de Rivoli, and in the last years of his life he lived at Fazenda do Brejão, in the interior of São Paulo. Some friends indicate the figure of Eduardo Prado as a model for Jacinto, a character in A Cidade e as Serras, by Eça de Queirós, as the millionaire bored by the comforts of civilization and who will end his days in the stillness of the Portuguese mountains of Tormes.

References

Brazilian writers
1860 births
1901 deaths
People from São Paulo